The William A. Nelden House is a historic house in northeastern Salt Lake City, Utah, that is located within the University Neighborhood Historic District, but is individually listed on the National Register of Historic Places (NRHP).

Description
The house is located at 1172 East 100 South. Constructed in 1894 and designed by American architect Frederick Albert Hale, the two-story house "is one of Utah's earliest and purest examples of Georgian Revival architecture" according to its NRHP nomination. It was built at an approximate cost of $8,000.

It was listed on the NRHP on October 19, 1978.

See also

 National Register of Historic Places listings in Salt Lake City

References

External links

National Register of Historic Places in Salt Lake City
Houses on the National Register of Historic Places in Utah
Colonial Revival architecture in Utah
Houses in Salt Lake City
Houses completed in 1894